The 2021 UCI Europe Tour was the 17th season of the UCI Europe Tour. The season began on 24 January 2021 with the Clàssica Comunitat Valenciana 1969 – Gran Premio Valencia and ended on 24 October 2021 with the Ronde van Drenthe.

Throughout the season, points were awarded to the top finishers of stages within stage races and the final general classification standings of each of the stages races and one-day events. The quality and complexity of a race also determined how many points are awarded to the top finishers; the higher the UCI rating of a race, the more points were awarded.

The UCI ratings from highest to lowest are as follows:
 Multi-day events: 2.Pro, 2.1 and 2.2
 One-day events: 1.Pro, 1.1 and 1.2

Events

January

February

March

April

May

June

July

August

September

October

Notes

References

External links 
 

 
UCI Europe Tour
UCI Europe Tour
UCI